Sun National Bank  is the primary subsidiary of Sun Bancorp, Inc. (Nasdaq: SNBC), a $2.3 billion asset bank holding company headquartered in Mount Laurel, New Jersey.  The Bank serves consumers and businesses through more than 30 branch locations in New Jersey, as well as commercial lending offices in New Jersey, Pennsylvania and New York.   Sun National Bank is an Equal Housing Lender and it's deposits are insured up to the legal maximum by the Federal Deposit Insurance Corporation (FDIC). In 2015, the Bank announced a major rebrand initiative for Sun National Bank, as well as its financial planning subsidiary, Prosperis Financial Solutions.

On January 31, 2018 OceanFirst Financial Corp acquired Sun Bancorp, Inc.

References

Holding companies of the United States